Anne Provoost (born 26 July 1964) is a Flemish author who now lives in Antwerp with her husband and three children.

Career
Anne Provoost was born in the Belgian town of Poperinge. She grew up in a family of four children in West Flanders and went on to pursue Germanic studies at the linked universities of Kortrijk and Leuven. Although she had been writing stories since childhood, she thought nothing of it until she began to win competitions while a student. She continued her education with a one-year course in pedagogics and then, having married Manu Claeys, went to join him in Minneapolis, where he was studying American literature. During this time, she started contributing to Belgian and American children's newspapers and also wrote her first novel, My Aunt is a Pilot Whale (1991), which is set in the USA. She returned to Belgium in 1989 and worked part-time for an international exchange organisation, but after the success of her second novel, Falling, she decided to become a full-time writer.

Anne Provoost is known for remaking myths, folk tales, fairy tales, and bible stories. Once a year, she writes a letter to Hans Christian Andersen answering one of his stories. Apart from being a novelist, Provoost also writes essays on literature and children's literature as well as short stories. Her work, originally published in Dutch, has been translated into many European languages as well as Afrikaans, Amharic, Arabic and Turkish.

She was made a member of Royal Academy of Dutch Language and Literature in 2003. In June 2007, she was a candidate for the Senate for the Flemish Green Party.

The novels
Anne Provoost is counted as a novelist for young adults and her stories are usually related by youngsters from their slightly puzzled point of view. The first two of her books dealt with controversial themes. In My Aunt is a Pilot Whale it is sexual abuse. Her second novel, Falling (1994), deals with the allure of neo-Nazi rhetoric. Both these won awards and critical acclaim, particularly Falling, which has been adapted three times for theatre and was made into an English-language feature film in 2001.

In 1997 Provoost retold the fairy tale of Beauty and the Beast in The Rose and the Swine, set in mediaeval Antwerp. In the Shadow of the Ark (2001) is an account of the biblical story of Noah told from the perspective of a teenage girl who was not chosen to survive the deluge. Both these take a critical look at the traditional religious mind-set, a theme she has taken further in her essay Beloved Unbelievers: Atheist Sermon (2008), in which she makes a plea for organisation in the face of right-wing Christian fundamentalism.

Her newest novel, Looking into the Sun, was published 2007. It is the story of a young girl living on an Australian farm with her mother, who has bad eyesight and knows she may be going blind. Her father has died after a fall from a horse and the mother tries but fails to keep the farm going.

Selected works

Novels 
 My Aunt Is a Pilot Whale (1990)
 Falling (1994)
 The Rose and the Swine (1997)
 In the Shadow of the Ark (2001)
 Looking into the Sun (2007)

Essays 
 Second Letter to Hans Christian Andersen
 Bad endings for children.  Hopelessness and consolation; growing up, willing or not
 So here's the bad news. The child as an antagonist
 Identification in Falling. If goblins don't exist...

Film adaptations 
Falling (the movie)

Awards
1991 - Belgium, Boekenleeuw for My Aunt is a Pilot Whale
1991 - Belgium, Prijs Letterkunde van de Vlaamse Provincies - Jeugd- en kinderboek, for My Aunt is a Pilot Whale
1995 - The Netherlands, Woutertje Pieterse Prijs for Falling
1995 - Belgium, Boekenleeuw for Falling
1995 - International, Honour list IBBY for Falling
1995 - Belgium, Gouden Uil voor kinder- en jeugdliteratuur for Falling
1995 - The Netherlands, Zilveren Griffel for Falling
1995 - International, Special mention White Ravens for Falling
1996 - Belgium, Prijs Letterkunde van de Vlaamse Provincies - Jeugd- en Kinderboek for Falling
1997 - France, Shortlist Prix du Lecteur of Mans and Sarthe for Falling
1998 - International, Honour list IBBY for The Rose and the Swine
1998 - Belgium, Shortlist for Gouden Uil for The Rose and the Swine
1998 - Belgium, Boekenleeuw for The Rose and the Swine
1998 - The Netherlands, Gouden Zoen for The Rose and the Swine
2000 - Germany, Luchs-Award from Die Zeit for The Rose and the Swine
2000 - Germany, Prijs van Nordrhein-Westfalen for My Aunt is a Pilot Whale, Falling and The Rose and the Swine
2000 - Belgium, Lavki-award for Falling, a 5-yearly award of the city of Hasselt
2001 - Austria, Sonderpreis from the Jury der Jungen Leser for The Rose and the Swine
2002 - The Netherlands, Gouden Zoen for In the Shadow of the Ark
2002 - Belgium, Boekenwelp for In the Shadow of the Ark
2002 - Belgium, Longlist Gouden Uil for In the Shadow of the Ark
2004 - USA, Children's Book Sense Picks for In the Shadow of the Ark
2005 - Belgium, Prijs Letterkunde van de Provincie West-Vlaanderen - Jeugd- en Kinderboek for In the Shadow of the Ark
2005 - International, Longlist International IMPAC Dublin Literary Award for In the Shadow of the Ark
2007 - The Netherlands, Longlist LIBRIS-award for Looking into the Sun
2007 - The Netherlands, Shortlist Halewijn-award in Roermond for Looking into the Sun
2008 - The Netherlands, Woman&Culture Award for Looking into the Sun.
2009 - Belgium, the 3-yearly Culture Award of Flanders for Looking into the Sun.

See also 
 Flemish literature

References

External links 

 
 Anne Provoost at the PEN American Center
 Anne Provoost with Bill Moyers on "Faith & Reason" (streaming video)
 Portraits: Anne Provoost

1964 births
Living people
Belgian essayists
KU Leuven alumni
People from West Flanders
Belgian women essayists
Flemish women writers
20th-century Belgian women writers
20th-century Belgian writers
21st-century Belgian women writers
21st-century Belgian writers
Woutertje Pieterse Prize winners
Boekenleeuw winners